The Sanskriti School is an English-speaking co-educational private school in Rohtak, Haryana, India. It is run by the Patliputra Education Society and affiliated to the Central Board of Secondary Education (CBSE). It has been functional since April 9th, 2002.

Houses

School students and teachers are divided into four houses: 
-Aravali 
-Himalaya
-Shivalik
-Vindhyachal. 
These four houses compete with each other in various competitions of sports, quizzes, debates, and declamations.

Sports
Several outdoor and indoor sports are available for competitive play at the school, including basketball, cricket, football, hockey, volleyball, throwball, korfball, chess, carrom, table tennis, and swimming.

Significant figures 
Madhulika Singh - Principal

See also
Education in India
Literacy in India  
List of institutions of higher education in Haryana

References

External links

Schools in Haryana